Claire Beaugrand-Champagne (born 1948) is a Canadian documentary photographer. She is known for her socially engaged work and, having started her career in 1970, is considered the first female press photographer in Quebec. She was a member of the Groupe d'action photographique (GAP) alongside Michel Campeau, Gabor Szilasi, Roger Charbonneau et Pierre Gaudard

Beaugrand-Champagne's is known for her work documenting Quebec society, including contributing to Disraeli, une expérience humaine en photographie (1972-1974). Her photographs are part of several museum collections including: National Gallery of Canada, Musée national des beaux-arts du Québec, Musée d'art contemporain de Montréal, Library and Archives Canada and McCord Museum.

She trained at the Collège Marguerite-Bourgeoys, Marylebone Institute and the CEGEP du Vieux-Montréal

Major exhibitions
 Claire Beaugrand-Champagne. Émouvante Vérité. Photographies de 1970 à 2013, McCord Museum, Montreal, December 2013 - April 2014
 La photographie d'auteur au Québec - Une collection prend forme au musée, Montreal Museum of Fine Arts, Montreal, July 2013 - December 2013
 Femmes artistes. L'éclatement des frontières, 1965-2000. Musée national des beaux-arts du Québec, Québec, June 2010 - October 2010
 Déclics. Art et Société. Le Québec des années 60 et 70. Musée d'art contemporain de Montréal, Montreal and Musée de la civilisation, Québec, May 1999 - October 1999
 Esthétiques actuelles de la photographie au Québec, Rencontres d'Arles, Arles, July 1982 and Musée d'art contemporain de Montréal, Montreal, December 1982 - January 1983

Bibliography
 Pierre, Landry. Le documentaire et au-delà, Femmes artistes du XXe siècle au Québec. collection Arts du Québec, Musée national des beaux-arts du Québec, 2010
 Claire Beaugrand-Champagne. Des gens de mon quartier, Les Éditions Libre Expression, 2004
 Sandra Grant-Marchand. Esthétiques actuelles de la photographie au Québec : Onze photographes. Musée d'art contemporain de Montréal, 1982

References

External links
 Fonds Claire Beaugrand-Champagne (R9761) at Library and Archives Canada

1948 births
Living people
Artists from Montreal
Canadian women photographers
Documentary photographers
Women photojournalists